Podiceps arndti is an extinct species of grebe from the Upper Pliocene of California.

History
The species was described in a monograph on fossil birds of the San Diego Formation from Robert M. Chandler in 1990. The species name "arndti" is in honor of Joseph Arndt for his contributions for the Natural History Museum of Los Angeles County with collecting fossils from the San Diego Formation.

Description
Specimens of Podiceps arndti consisted of several associated femura, tibiotarsi and tarsometatarsi. The species can be differentiated from other species of Podiceps in which the trochanteric ridge of the femur separated from the trochanter. The depression inside of the trochanteric ridge is more distal to the iliac surface than beside the ridge as well. The species is smaller than the red-necked grebe (P. grisegena), though it was larger than other species of contemporary grebes with only the later P. parvus being of similar size.

Paleobiology
P. arndti comes from the Piacenzian aged aforementioned San Diego Formation.

References

arndti
Fossil taxa described in 1990
Piacenzian species
Birds described in 1990